We Can't Have Everything was a 1918 American silent drama film directed and written by Cecil B. DeMille based upon a novel by Rupert Hughes. The film is considered to be lost.

Plot
As described in a film magazine, very much in love with her husband, Charity Coe Cheever (Williams) discovers that her husband is in love with Zada L'Etoile (Breamer), a popular dancer, and so she divorces him. Jim Dyckman (Dexter), who has always loved Charity since their childhood days, after finding it impossible to win Charity had married film actress Kedzie Thropp (Hawley). When Jim is free but Charity is not, Jim is very disappointed, but both decide to make the best of it. During one of Jim's absences Kedzie meets the young British airman, the Marquis Of Strathdene (Hatten), and falls very much in love with him. Out for a ride one evening, Jim and Charity are forced during a storm to remain in a roadhouse. Here is Kedzie's chance, she sues for divorce and marries her English aviator. The start of the war puts Jim in the trenches in Europe and Charity in a convalescent hospital, they meet again and love finally wins.

Cast
 Kathlyn Williams as Charity Coe Cheever
 Elliott Dexter as Jim Dyckman
 Wanda Hawley as Kedzie Thropp
 Sylvia Breamer as Zada L'Etoile
 Thurston Hall as Peter Cheever
 Raymond Hatton as Marquis Of Strathdene
 Tully Marshall as The Director
 Theodore Roberts as The Sultan
 James Neill as Detective
 Ernest Joy as Heavy
 William Elmer as Props
 Charles Ogle as Kedzie's Father
 Sylvia Ashton as Kedzie's Mother

References

External links

 Hughes, Rupert (1917), We Can't Have Everything, New York: Harper and Brothers Publishing, on the Internet Archive

1918 films
1918 drama films
1918 lost films
Silent American drama films
American silent feature films
American black-and-white films
Films based on American novels
Films based on works by Rupert Hughes
Films directed by Cecil B. DeMille
Lost American films
Lost drama films
Paramount Pictures films
1910s American films